The Bandini 1000 V sports prototype is a race car built in 1970 by Bandini Cars Forlì.

This two-seater sports together for many years previous 1000/66 (which represents the evolution but not replacement), the Saloncino and the subsequent 1000/72 on the slopes and runs uphill from across Italy.
The now-consolidated characteristics of previous Bandini, plus the latest news from the head completely designed by Ilario Bandini and carried out in aluminium as the entire engine 1000 cc. This provides for the use of vertical Solex carburetors (hence the V the acronym) posts orthogonally to the plan sparked by two camshafts.
Completely new is the choice of the body with a rear section of greater than the rest of the car producing large openings for the engine compartment, as are the new places to flap its four ends with clear aerodynamic function.

The chassis

The frame, a frame of special steel tubes, comes directly from that of 1000/66, although the experience gained from racing, from tests on track and recent birth of Bandini saloncino contribute to the emergence of a chassis that in addition to the two main beams section elliptical also see the use of elements to round section in addition to a different arrangement of weights and engine which takes an Operating increasingly bearing.
New mergers of portamozzi allow a variation of the angles characteristic of suspensions.
 Structure and material: frame of elliptical and round section tubes, special steel aeronautics derivation;  engine semiportante
 Suspension:
 Front: Independent, triangles overlapping with shock hydraulic telescopic tilted and springs cylindrical helical coaxial; bar Account
 Rear: Independent, triangle and lower arms swinging shock hydraulic telescopic inclined agents on portamozzo, torsion bar, camber, caster and toe adjustable
 Braking system:
 Service: hydraulics, disc front and rear
 Steering: a pinion and cremegliera
 Guide: left
 Wheels: Alloy Campagnolo
 Fuel tank: 
 Transmission: differential and return rear Colotti, rear wheel drive
 Weight: <

Engine Bandini 1000 cc

 Positioning: longitudinal rear, 4-cylinder in-line
 Materials and particularity: double camshaft Head aluminium a chamber burst and pistons air emisferico, distribution chain with trees to tenditore cams on roller bearings, monoblock and base to five media bench in a single fusion and sump alloy of aluminum, chrome pipes of cylinders and to dismantle, aluminium rods.
 Bore: 
 Stroke: 
 Displacement: 987 cc
 Compression ratio: 9:1
 Fuel system: 2 Solex carburetors double body
 Power: 115 CV @ 8000 rpm
 Lubricate: Carter with wet gear pump and filter external
 Cooling: forced liquid with centrifugal pump controlled by pulley and belt, cooler on the front
 Gearbox and clutch: Colotti 5 synchronized speed + RG clutch single dry disc
 Ignition and electrical equipment: coil and distributor on the head, battery 12 V and generator

The body

The body Bandini aluminum is made up of a removable front quickly, low and round, with a generous air-intake oval in the middle, very similar to the previous 1000/66 but here, is flanked by two fins fixed with two grids outburst in front of the passenger compartment. This part was amended in mid-1972. The space for lighthouses is exploited to increase the strength of air downward, defining more decisively the air-intake that appears even more squared and acquires a much wider outlet. The rear part receives the difference in width than the rest of the car, this creates large air-intakes for the engine side and also thanks to the panel sealing perfectly the engine compartment, door very clean flows to fixed rear flap. In a second time, were also installed screens for the rear wheels that had already been used on "Saponetta" from the runway.

See also
 Ilario Bandini
 Bandini Cars

Bandini vehicles
Sports prototypes
1970s cars
Sports cars
Cars introduced in 1970